101 Flight an Uzbek biographical dramatic film directed by Akrom Shakhnazarov and producer Ravshan Norbaev about flight HY101 and captain Zarif Saidazimov, based on his autobiography about the last flight before retirement.

Plot 
In the early morning of September 11, 2001, a Boeing 757 aircraft, belonging to the Uzbekistan Airways, took off over Uzbekistan. This is the final flight of the experienced pilot Zarif Saidazimov, before he goes on a free flight - retirement. 101-Flight is in transit through London Birmingham International Airport to John F Kennedy International Airport in New York.

Approaching in the air to the John F Kennedy International Airport, Captain Zarif Saidazimov, suddenly receives a command from the dispatcher to land at another airport located in Boston. The captain announces this to the passengers and heads for Boston. There was not much left to Boston, when and from there their dispatcher informs that the plane needs to land at the airport of Gandern International Airport in the territory of Canada. Captain Saidazimov is left with nothing but to follow instructions. Warning the crew about the changes, he asks them to keep calm among the passengers. 

When this news reaches the passengers, confusion and panic envelop the cabin of the plane. After all, they could only see this in Hollywood movies. All passengers and crew members find themselves in a suspended and uncertain situation. The film sheds light on these events.

Cast 
 Hoshim Arslonov as chief pilot Zarif Saidazimov
 Umid Iskandarov as co-pilot Botir Makhmudov
 Oleg Galahov as pilot Fyodor Denisov
 Lola Eltoyeva as flight attendant Nigora Yusupova
 Khurshid Tuhtayev as pilot Rashid Nizomov
 Erkin Bozorov as passenger Jahongir
 Bahora Arslonova as stewardess Aziza
 Farhod Abdullayev as passenger Farhod
 Nigina Anarbayeva as stewardess Sevara 
 Shokhrullo Abdullaev as passenger Shoxrux

References

External links 
 

2020 films